Vanessa Landi (born 12 September 1997) is an Italian archer competing in women's recurve events. Landi and Mauro Nespoli won the bronze medal in the mixed team recurve event at the 2019 World Archery Championships held in 's-Hertogenbosch, Netherlands.

At the 2018 European Archery Championships in Legnica, Poland, she won the silver medal in the women's team recurve event and the gold medal in the mixed recurve team event.

In 2019, she represented Italy at the European Games held in Minsk, Belarus without winning a medal. At the 2019 Archery World Cup she won, alongside Tatiana Andreoli and Lucilla Boari, the silver medal in the women's team recurve event in Medellín, Colombia.

In 2021, she competed at the World Archery Championships held in Yankton, United States.

She won the silver medal in the women's recurve event at the 2022 European Indoor Archery Championships held in Laško, Slovenia.

References

External links 
 

Living people
1997 births
Place of birth missing (living people)
Italian female archers
World Archery Championships medalists
Archers at the 2019 European Games
European Games competitors for Italy
21st-century Italian women